Birthday is a 1977 Azerbaijani musical film directed by Rasim Ojagov. The film plot is based on Rustam Ibrahimbeyov's short stories "Birthday" and "Business Trip".

Plot
This film is about true friendship. The characters in the film are contemporaries in late 1970s Azerbaijan SSR with differing visions of the world, yet together share a true and lasting friendship.

Cast
 Haji Ismayilov as Mustafa
 David Uplisashvili as Ali
 Yashar Nuri as Eldar
 Fuad Poladov as Nazim

See also 
Azerbaijani films of the 1970s

References

External links

Soviet-era Azerbaijanian films
Azerbaijani-language films
Soviet musical films
1970s musical films
Azerbaijanfilm films
Films directed by Rasim Ojagov
Azerbaijani musical films